The 1999 Super League Grand Final was the Second official Grand Final conclusive and championship-deciding game of the Super League IV season. The match was played between St. Helens and Bradford Bulls on Saturday 9 October 1999, at Old Trafford.

Background

Super League IV retained the top five play off after the success of the previous years Grand Final. The league was expanded to 14 teams with Wakefield Trinity Wildcats and Gateshead Thunder both made their debuts in Super League although Gateshead Thunder and Sheffield Eagles both left the league after merging with Hull FC and Huddersfield Giants respectively. Bradford Bulls finished as League Leaders for the first time since they finished top in Super League II as Champions.

Route to the Final

Bradford Bulls
By finishing first in the regular season, Bradford automatically qualified for the play-off semi-final. They were drawn at home to St Helens and in a one-sided game, they brushed St Helens aside 40–4 to qualify for the Grand Final.

St Helens
The play-off system in use only gave the league leaders a bye to the semi-finals. St Helens had finished second so had to play a qualifying play-off first. Drawn at home to Leeds Rhinos St Helens won 38–14 to go through to the semi-final. This was an away fixture to Bradford where they were beaten 40–4. However this loss did not end their season. The losers of the qualifying semi-final got another chance by playing the winners of the other semi-final in a final eliminator. Therefore Saints' third play-off game was a home tie against Castleford Tigers where they won through 36–6.

Match details

References

External links
1999 Super League Grand Final at rlphotos.com

Super League Grand Finals
St Helens R.F.C. matches
Bradford Bulls matches
Grand final
Super League Grand Final
Super League Grand Final